This is a list of streets in Karachi, Pakistan.

List

See also
 Transport in Karachi
 List of historic roads

References

Further reading
 Junaidi, Shah Waliullah (2020). Yeh Sharea-e-Aam Nahin: Karachi Ki Yadgar Sardkain 

Streets
Karachi
Karachi